Joseph-André Motte (6 January 1925 – 1 June 2013) was a French furniture designer and interior designer and ranks among the most influential and innovative figures of post-war French design.

Joseph-André Motte was born in Saint-Bonnet-en-Champsaur (southeastern France in the Hautes-Alpes).
After passing his ‘baccalauréat’, he studied at the École des Arts Appliqués in Paris (École nationale supérieure des arts appliqués et des métiers d'art), where he graduated in 1948 at the top of his class.

His career is divided into two different stages. At first, he focused on furniture design up to the end of the 1960s. Later, he shifted his career to interior design.

Furniture design
In the period after World War II (1939–45) there was increased interest in using new methods and materials for mass production of furniture. Manufacturers of materials such as Formica, plywood, aluminum, and steel sponsored the salons of the Société des artistes décorateurs. Designers who exhibited their experimental work at the salons in this period included Motte, Pierre Guariche, René-Jean Caillette, Jean Prouvé, Charlotte Perriand, Antoine Philippon and Jacqueline Lecoq.

Motte began his career as a furniture designer at the Bon Marché, one of the oldest Parisian department stores and cooperated with Marcel Gascoin’s workshop.
In 1954, he founded his own agency and co-founded the Atelier de Recherche Plastique (Studio for Plastic Research) with Michel Mortier and Pierre Guariche.
His prolific career let him rise to the top of postwar designers whose mission was to refurnish French homes with industrial materials and contemporary style, integrating modern forms with conventional techniques, using traditional and modern materials: rattan, foam, plastic, Formica, plywood, stainless steel, and glass.

Motte’s projects covered a global range of furniture and furniture accessories:
 Office furniture,
 Chairs,
 Tables,
 Lights,
 Sanitary and heating facilities.

Some of his most famed chairs are the
 Tripod Chair (1949),
 Catherine Chair, (1952),
 Sabre Chair (1954),
 740 Chair (1957),
 770 (1958).

He participated in many exhibitions such as Salon des artistes décorateurs, Salon des arts ménagers and Universal exhibition Brussels Expo’58.

Interior design
From the 1960s to the early 1990s (until his retirement), Motte was in charge of prolific and prestigious interior design commissions like public interiors for the French government including:
 Paris Métro stations (more than 100 stations),
 the interiors and furnishings for the Orly Airport,
 the interiors and furnishings for the Charles de Gaulle Airport,
 the interiors and furnishings for the Lyon Airport
 parts of the Louvre Museum
 parts of the state radio's Broadcasting House, Paris
 French prefectures and town halls
 The Council of Europe in Strasbourg
He also got many contracts abroad in Sub-Saharan Africa and North Africa including the presidential palace in Bamako and many hotels in Algeria, Tunisia, Congo and Mali.

He was honored with many awards such as the Golden Compass (Compasso d'Oro), La Triennale di Milano, Prix René Gabriel.
In 1990, he was awarded the French Ordre des Arts et des Lettres (Grade of Commander).

See also
:fr:Joseph-André Motte
Architecture of the Paris Métro

References

External links

1925 births
2013 deaths
Commandeurs of the Ordre des Arts et des Lettres
French industrial designers
People from Hautes-Alpes